Jaitwara is a town and a nagar panchayat in Satna district in the Indian state of Madhya Pradesh.

Demographics 
 India census, Jaitwara had a population of 8,903. Males constitute 51% of the population and females 49%. Jaitwara has an average literacy rate of 59%, lower than the national average of 59.5%: male literacy is 69%, and female literacy is 50%. In Jaitwara, 18% of the population is under 6 years of age. It is located near the border of Uttar Pradesh. The nearest city is Satna.

References

Cities and towns in Satna district